The 1988 All-Ireland Senior Ladies' Football Championship Final was the twelfth All-Ireland Final and the deciding match of the 1988 All-Ireland Senior Ladies' Football Championship, an inter-county ladies' Gaelic football tournament for the top teams in Ireland.

Laois goaled after just two minutes but Kerry led 0–5 to 1–1 at half-time. Lil O'Sullivan scored a goal for Kerry soon after and they won their eighth title in a row convincingly.

References

!
All-Ireland Senior Ladies' Football Championship Finals
Kerry county ladies' football team matches
Laois county ladies' football team matches
All-Ireland